Timothy Joseph “T. J.” Conley Jr. (born August 29, 1985) is an American football punter who currently is a free agent. He was signed as an undrafted free agent by the New York Jets in 2009. He played college football at Idaho.

Professional career

New York Jets
Conley was signed to a future contract on January 7, 2011. Conley competed with punter Chris Bryan to determine the eventual replacement for former incumbent Steve Weatherford. Conley was named the starter heading into the 2011 season on August 30, 2011. Conley was waived on September 4, 2012.

Minnesota Vikings
Conley signed with the Minnesota Vikings on January 9, 2013. He was released on April 29, 2013.

Cleveland Browns
Conley signed with the Cleveland Browns on May 14, 2013. He was waived on August 22, 2013.

Cincinnati Bengals
On April 16, 2014 Conley signed with the Cincinnati Bengals.

Personal life
Conley was born to Laurie and Timothy Conley. Conley married his fiancée Tassie Souhrada in 2010. The couple has a son, Brayden Patrick Conley, and a daughter, McKenzie Claire Conley.
He now works as a coach at Eastern Washington University in Cheney, Washington.

References

External links
Idaho Vandals bio

Living people
1985 births
American football punters
Idaho Vandals football players
New York Jets players
Minnesota Vikings players
Cleveland Browns players
Cincinnati Bengals players
Players of American football from Tacoma, Washington